The Department of Health is a department of the Government of Ireland. The department's mission is to "support, protect and empower individuals, families and their communities to achieve their full health potential by putting health at the centre of public policy and by leading the development of high quality, equitable and efficient health and personal social services." The department is led by the Minister for Health.

The department attracts much controversy particularly due to the HSE. Brian Cowen, a former minister for health, referred to it as "Angola" clarifying "just when you've cleared one land mine another goes off".

Departmental team
The headquarters and ministerial offices of the department are in Miesian Plaza, Baggot Street, Dublin. The departmental team consists of the following:

Minister for Health: Stephen Donnelly, TD
Minister of State with responsibility for mental health and older people: Mary Butler, TD
Minister of State with responsibility for public health, well being, and the National Drugs Strategy: Hildegarde Naughton, TD
Minister of State with responsibility for Disability: Anne Rabbitte, TD
Secretary General of the Department: Robert Watt

History
The department was created by the Ministers and Secretaries (Amendment) Act 1946. This took effect in 1947 with James Ryan as the first Minister. Prior to this, the Department for Local Government and Public Health was responsible for Health.

Alteration of name and transfer of functions

Structure
The role of the department and departmental team is to support the minister and the democratic process by:

Formulating policy underpinned by an evidence-based approach and providing direction on national health priorities ensuring that quality and value for money are enhanced through the implementation of an evidence-based approach underpinned by monitoring and evaluation. 
Protecting the interests of patients and consumers and supporting practitioners and professionals to practice to the highest standards by providing a prudent and appropriate regulatory framework. 
Providing effective stewardship over health resources by demanding accountability for achieving outcomes including financial, managerial and clinical accountability, and by providing the frameworks, including enhanced service planning at national level to improve the overall governance of the health system. 
Fulfilling the state's obligations in relation to the EU, WHO, Council of Europe and other international bodies and the continued implementation of the co-operation agenda decided by the North-South Ministerial Council.

See also
Health Information and Quality Authority
Healthcare in Ireland

References

External links
Department of Health
Structure of the Department
Spending by the Department

 
Health
Ireland
Ireland, Health
1947 establishments in Ireland
Ministries established in 1947